Kleidocerys is a genus of seed bugs in the family Lygaeidae. There are about 17 described species in Kleidocerys.

Species
These 17 species belong to the genus Kleidocerys:

 Kleidocerys costaricensis Cervantes & Brailovsky, 2010
 Kleidocerys denticollis (Stal, 1874)
 Kleidocerys dimidiatus Barber, 1953
 Kleidocerys ericae (Horvath, 1909)
 Kleidocerys franciscanus (Stal, 1859)
 Kleidocerys hispaniola Baranowski, 2005
 Kleidocerys modestus Barber, 1953
 Kleidocerys nubilus (Distant, 1883)
 Kleidocerys obovatus (Van Duzee, 1931)
 Kleidocerys ovalis Barber, 1953
 Kleidocerys pallipes Brailovsky, 1976
 Kleidocerys privignus (Horvath, 1894)
 Kleidocerys punctatus (Distant, 1893)
 Kleidocerys resedae (Panzer, 1793) (birch catkin bug)
 Kleidocerys suffusus Barber, 1947
 Kleidocerys truncatulus (Walker, 1872)
 Kleidocerys virescens Fabricius, 1794

References

Further reading

External links

 

Lygaeidae
Articles created by Qbugbot